The City Center District is an area in north-central downtown Dallas, Texas (USA). It lies south of the Arts District, north of the Main Street District, northwest of Deep Ellum, southwest of Bryan Place and east of the West End Historic District. The district contains a large concentration of downtown commercial space which prior to 1950 had been concentrated along Main Street. The district also contains remnants of Theatre Row, the historical entertainment area along Elm Street which contained theatres such as the Majestic Theatre.

Notable structures and parks 

 2100 Ross Avenue
 Sheraton Dallas Hotel
 Bryan Tower
 The Drever
 Energy Plaza
 Fidelity Union Tower
 Republic Center
 Harwood Center
 JPMorgan Chase Tower
 KPMG Centre
 Majestic Theatre
 Patriot Tower
 Plaza of the Americas
 Renaissance Tower
 Ross Tower
 Thanksgiving Tower
 U.S. Post Office
 Corrigan Tower
 211 North Ervay
 505 North Ervay
 Hartford Building
 Thanks-Giving Square
 Aston Park

Transportation

Highways 
  US 75 Central Expressway/ I-45 connection (unsigned  I-345)

Trains 
 Akard Station
 St. Paul Station
 Pearl Station

Education 

The City Center District is served by the Dallas Independent School District.

The neighborhood schools for downtown are outside of the loop.

Four elementary schools—City Park, Sam Houston, Hope Medrano, and Ignacio Zaragoza; three middle schools—Billy Earl Dade, Thomas J. Rusk, and Alex W. Spence; and two high schools—James Madison and North Dallas, serve the district.

Private Schools

Holy Trinity Catholic School has served Dallas' central neighborhoods since 1914 and is located at the corner of Oak Lawn Avenue and Gilbert Avenue. Providing early education for three-year-olds through eighth grade, Holy Trinity is the oldest continually operating Catholic school in North Texas.

Residents are also served by First Baptist Academy of Dallas, a Biblically-integrated, college preparatory K-12 school located in the city center district of downtown Dallas.

References 

Neighborhoods in Downtown Dallas